Caspar Pauckstadt (born 14 August 1964) is a Swedish former footballer who played as a midfielder.

References

Association football midfielders
Swedish footballers
Allsvenskan players
Malmö FF players
Living people
1964 births